Kenneth Bergquist may refer to:

 Kenneth P. Bergquist (United States Air Force) (1912–1993), officer of the United States Air Force
 Kenneth P. Bergquist (Department of Defense) (born 1944), United States Assistant Secretary of the Navy